Bewley Common is a hamlet in Wiltshire, England.

Bewley Court is a Grade I listed manor house from the 14th century or early 15th. The house was restored and extended c. 1920 to designs by Harold Brakspear, and was the home of interior designer Oliver Ford until his death in 1992.

References

External links 

Hamlets in Wiltshire